The 1995–96 season was the 65th season for Real Madrid CF in La Liga.

Summary
Real Madrid finished its most tumultuous and disastrous domestic season since 1976–77 by finishing in a lowly 6th place. Contrary to the previous nine seasons under the guidance of Leo Beenhakker, John Toshack, Alfredo Di Stéfano, Radomir Antić, Benito Floro, Vicente del Bosque, and Jorge Valdano, Real Madrid's offense malfunctioned as a result of systemic injuries of key players. In November, Ramón Mendoza resigned as president due to economic, social, and sporting problems plaguing the club, with successful Real Madrid director Lorenzo Sanz being promoted to the presidency and tasked with overseeing the club's recovery. Three months later, Jorge Valdano was sacked as a consequence of the team's bad league form and an early Copa del Rey exit, having been eliminated by Espanyol in the round of 16. Former Deportivo La Coruña manager Arsenio Iglesias took over on 24 January 1996.

With Iglesias at the helm, Real Madrid managed to salvage some respectability by reaching the quarter-finals of the Champions League, where they were eliminated by Juventus 2–1 on aggregate, and finishing sixth in the league. The latter technically allowed Madrid to enter the following season's Intertoto Cup (which was staged in the summer and served as a qualifier for the UEFA Cup), but they passed on the opportunity, meaning there would be no European football for Real next season for the first time since 1977.

Squad

Transfers

In

 from Real Zaragoza
 from S.S.C. Napoli
 from Real Madrid C
 from Sevilla FC
 from Real Madrid C
 from Crvena Zvezda (October)

Out

 to  Club Celaya
 to Real Betis
 to Real Zaragoza
 to Real Oviedo
 to Real Valladolid
 to Deportivo La Coruña
 to RCD Espanyol (December)
 to Sevilla FC (January)

Competitions

La Liga

League table

Results by round

Matches

Copa del Rey

Round of 16

UEFA Champions League

Group phase

Group D

Quarter-finals

Supercopa de España

Statistics

Squad statistics

References

External links
 Madrid - 1995–96 BDFutbol

Real Madrid
Real Madrid CF seasons